Rudniki (formerly ) is a district of Gdańsk, Poland, located in the eastern part of the city. It is a predominantly industrial district and the Gdańsk Oil Refinery of Grupa Lotos is located within its borders.

References

External links
 Map of Rudniki

Districts of Gdańsk